John Grey "Jack" Taiaroa (16 September 1862 – 31 December 1907), of Ngāi Tahu descent, was a New Zealand rugby union player. A halfback, he played nine matches for the New Zealand national team in 1884—the warm-up in Wellington and all eight matches of the tour of New South Wales; New Zealand won all eight games. There were no test matches on the tour, as there was not yet an Australian national team, and would not be until 1903.

Born in Otakou, the son of Hōri Kerei Taiaroa, a New Zealand Member of Parliament, Taiaroa played school-boy rugby for Otago Boys' High School and then for the Otago provincial side. He went on to set a national record in the long jump and represent Hawke's Bay in first-class cricket during the 1890s as an attacking batsman.

In 1886 Taiaroa hit the headlines after signing his father's name on a promissory note. Despite a warrant being issued for his arrest, it was not served and the charges were later dropped.

He spent most of his working life as a lawyer in Hastings. He was accidentally drowned in Otago Harbour on 31 December 1907 and his body was recovered at Karitane beach two weeks later.

References

1907 deaths
1862 births
Ngāi Tahu people
New Zealand international rugby union players
19th-century New Zealand lawyers
New Zealand cricketers
Hawke's Bay cricketers
New Zealand Māori lawyers
People from Otago Peninsula
Accidental deaths in New Zealand
Deaths by drowning in New Zealand
New Zealand male long jumpers
Otago rugby union players
People educated at Otago Boys' High School
Hawke's Bay rugby union players
Ellison family
Rugby union scrum-halves
Rugby union players from Otago
20th-century New Zealand lawyers